Aphanostola is a genus of moths in the family Gelechiidae.

Species
 Aphanostola atripalpis Meyrick, 1931
 Aphanostola intercepta Meyrick, 1932
 Aphanostola sparsipalpis Meyrick, 1931

References

Gelechiinae
Taxa named by Edward Meyrick
Moth genera